Motufetau is a small uninhabited islet of Nukufetau, Tuvalu, which is on the east side of Nukufetau atoll.

See also

 Desert island
 List of islands

References

Uninhabited islands of Tuvalu
Pacific islands claimed under the Guano Islands Act
Nukufetau